Bessemer City may refer to:-

Bessemer City, North Carolina
SS Bessemer City, a ship wrecked near St. Ives, Cornwall in 1936.